The 24th series of The Bill, a British television drama, was the antepenultimate series of the programme.

This series was the last to feature the killing of an officer, PC Emma Keane. The death on-screen led to the resignation of the longest serving character, PC Reg Hollis, his controversial exit off-screen after actor Jeff Stewart attempted suicide on set, after being axed by producers following 24 years on the show. Another long-term character, Inspector Gina Gold, left the show after six years as part of the aftermath of the storyline, Gold retiring after becoming increasingly terrified at the thought of losing another officer.

In the autumn, The Bill celebrated its 25th anniversary with scenes aired in Germany as part of a crossover with Leipzig Homicide to investigate the abduction of a German national in London. There was also a special documentary hosted by Martin Kemp, “The Bill Made Me Famous”, featuring interviews with the most famous guest stars to have featured on the show including Roger Daltrey, Lynda Bellingham and Les Dennis, along with a number of past and present characters from the show. As part of several multi-part storylines throughout the year, the longest in the show's history aired with the eight-part Witness storyline exploring gang culture after the death of a young mother, Carly Samuels, a character introduced in series 23 that bonded with Sergeant Dale Smith. The show also had a two-parter inspired by Moors murderer Myra Hyndley; Katy Cavanagh portrayed a jailed serial killer, Linda Johnson, who assisted DI Neil Manson tracking down a boy abducted by one of her victims. Other major storylines included new character DC Stevie Moss taking centre stage in the Too Hot to Handle three-part storyline, Moss going undercover with an ex-boyfriend, portrayed by Bill Ward. Sergeant Dale Smith also went undercover in the five-part Gun Runner storyline. As well as the aforementioned scenes filmed in Germany, The Bill also filmed special scenes in Glasgow for the episode Demolition Girl, attending the demolition of The Gorbals tower block for a plot involving PC Sally Armstrong and PC Benjamin Gayle.

On 2 April 2014, The Bill Series 24 Part 1 & 2 and The Bill Series 24 Part 3 & 4 DVD sets were released (in Australia).

Cast changes

Arrivals
 DC Stevie Moss (The Deadly Game-)
 CSE Eddie Olosunje (Deadly Cocktail-)
 DC Jacob Banks (R.I.P.P.I-)
 PC Leon Taylor (New Blood-)
 PC Millie Brown (New Blood-)
 PC Arun Ghir (New Blood-)
 PC Mel Ryder (Gun Runner: Trigger Happy-)
 Sgt Rachel Weston (Street Kid-)

Departures
 PC Diane Noble – transfers to county forces to spend time with her son
 PC Emma Keane – killed in bomb blast
 PC Reg Hollis – resigns after the death of Emma Keane
 Sgt Nikki Wright – resigns after not being able to balance work and family life
 Insp Gina Gold – resigns and retires after nearly losing several officers and the death of Emma Keane

Episodes

References

2008 British television seasons
The Bill series